Fedor Vesna was a famous 14th century Lithuanian falconer and ruler of Vitebsk from 1392 to 1393.

Fedor's fame as a successful falconer introduced him to Jogaila, the Grand Duke of Lithuania and King of Poland, with whom he became great friends. When Fedor retired from falconry in the 1390s, Jogaila granted him the title of duke and after the death of the last ruler of Principality of Vitebsk, Uliana of Tver in 1392, Jogaila abolished the principality and set Fedor to rule its lands. As Fedor Vesna was not a member of the Gediminids Dynasty and not even of noble birth, his exaltation was poorly received in the Grand Duchy and made him an obvious target for rival ambitions. Švitrigaila, the younger brother of Jogaila and duke of Polotsk, briefly captured Vitebsk in 1393. According to some Lithuanian chronicles, Švitrigaila killed Fedor Vesna upon the capture of Vitebsk.

References

Wolff J. Senatorowie i dygnitarze Wielkiego Księstwa Litewskiego: 1386–1795. Kraków, 1885. p. 85.

Year of birth missing
1393 deaths
14th-century Lithuanian nobility
Vitebsk